Long Way Home is the fourth studio album by Australian country musician Troy Cassar-Daley, released on 27 May 2002 and peaked at number 77 on the ARIA Charts

At the ARIA Music Awards of 2002, the album was nominated for the ARIA Award for Best Country Album.

Track listing

Charts

Certifications

Release history

References

2002 albums
Troy Cassar-Daley albums